Driven: From Homeless to Hero, My Journeys On and Off Lambeau Field is a memoir by former Green Bay Packers wide receiver Donald Driver, with assistance from sportswriter and author Peter Golenbock. Published in 2013, Driver recounts his childhood spent in poverty, his unlikely rise in athletics through college, and his 14-year career in the National Football League culminating in his victory in Super Bowl XLV. The book became a New York Times Best Seller. It was named by Publishers Weekly as a best seller in the hardcover non-fiction category the first month it was released. Sports Illustrated also ranked Driven as the third best sports book published in 2013.

References

Citations

Bibliography

 

History of the Green Bay Packers
2013 non-fiction books
Crown Publishing Group books